The 1968 American 500 was a NASCAR Grand National Series event that was held on October 27, 1968, at North Carolina Motor Speedway in Rockingham, North Carolina.

The transition to purpose-built racecars began in the early 1960s and occurred gradually over that decade.  Changes made to the sport by the late 1960s brought an end to the "strictly stock" vehicles of the 1950s.

Background
North Carolina Motor Speedway was opened as a flat, one-mile oval on October 31, 1965. In 1969, the track was extensively reconfigured to a high-banked, D-shaped oval just over one mile in length. In 1997, North Carolina Motor Speedway merged with Penske Motorsports, and was renamed North Carolina Speedway. Shortly thereafter, the infield was reconfigured, and competition on the infield road course, mostly by the SCCA, was discontinued. Currently, the track is home to the Fast Track High Performance Driving School,

Race report
There were 44 drivers who managed to qualify for this event. Only one foreigner was present – Australian-born driver Frank Gardner – would become the last-place driver due to an incident requiring a black flag on the first lap. He would become the "prototype" for Cup Series driver Marcos Ambrose even though Garnder would never run another Cup Series race after this one. Gardner's last-place finish within the confines of the American stock car world was eventually overshadowed by his championship victory at the 1968 British Saloon Car Championship while driving a European version of the Ford Escort Twin Cam.

American-born driver Dexter Gainey would be black-flagged exactly forty laps later and would be disqualified as well. Wendell Scott would become the lowest-finishing driver to complete the event; albeit 191 laps behind the lead lap drivers. Five hundred laps was raced at this event for a duration for four hours and forty-five minutes. Thirty-two thousand spectators would witness another Richard Petty victory with him out-racing David Pearson by a time of fifteen seconds. LeeRoy Yarbrough would finish in third place, and two laps behind the top two finishers. Petty was running an older chassis with current sheet metal because he could not get his 1968 vehicle to run on a super-speedway. Shortly after this race, his switch to Ford for 1969 was announced.

Cale Yarborough's solo qualifying performance of  would help him clinch the pole position for the event. While Yarborough and Bobby Isaac would dominate the opening laps of this event, the event ended up being a "Petty and Pearson" show for the final 100 laps. Glotzbach quit after he turned Bud Moore into the wall separating pit road from the racetrack on lap 59. Moore swerved to avoid a loose wheel on pit road and swerved into Glotzbach's path. Glotzbach was penalized a lap for the crash, so he parked the car.

Individual race winnings for the drivers ranged from the winner's share of $17,075 ($ when adjusted for inflation) to the last-place finisher's share of $515 ($ when adjusted for inflation). The entire prize purse that was handed out to all the qualifying participants was $69,800 ($ when adjusted for inflation). Twelve notable crew chiefs were reported as participating in the race; including Jake Elder, Bud Moore, Glen Wood, Banjo Matthews, Dale Inman, Harry Hyde and Junior Johnson.

Qualifying

Finishing order
Section reference: 

 Richard Petty
 David Pearson
 LeeRoy Yarbrough
 Tiny Lund
 Bobby Allison
 Don White
 James Hylton
 G.C. Spencer
 Richard Brickhouse
 Butch Hartman
 John Sears
 Friday Hassler
 Bobby Johns
 Bill Seifert
 Clyde Lynn
 Donnie Allison
 Bobby Isaac
 Earl Brooks
 Roy Tyner
 Walson Gardner
 Henley Gray
 Dick Johnson
 Jabe Thomas
 Dave Marcis
 Buddy Baker
 Cale Yarborough
 Wendell Scott
 Bill Champion
 Paul Goldsmith
 Tommy Gale
 Red Farmer
 Neil Castles
 Darrell Dieringer
 Pete Hamilton
 J.D. McDuffie
 James Sears
 Don Tarr
 Ervin Pruett
 E.J. Trivette
 Elmo Langley
 Charlie Glotzbach
 Bud Moore
 Dexter Gainey
 Frank Gardner

References

American 500
American 500
NASCAR races at Rockingham Speedway